Convoy ON 122 was a trade convoy of merchant ships during the second World War. It was the 122nd of the numbered series of ON convoys Outbound from the British Isles to North America. The ships departed Liverpool on 15 August 1942 and were joined on 17 August by Escort Group B6 of the Mid-Ocean Escort Force.

Background
As western Atlantic coastal convoys brought an end to the second happy time, Admiral Karl Dönitz, the Befehlshaber der U-Boote (commander in chief of U-Boats), shifted focus to the mid-Atlantic to avoid aircraft patrols. Although convoy routing was less predictable in the mid-ocean, Dönitz anticipated that the increased numbers of U-boats being produced would be able to effectively search the area with the advantage of intelligence gained through B-Dienst decryption of British Naval Cypher Number 3. However, of the 180 trans-Atlantic convoys sailing from the end of July 1942 until the end of April 1943, only 20 percent lost ships to U-boat attack.

The Norwegian-manned corvettes of Escort Group B6 fought three of these convoy battles in sequential voyages with convoys SC 104, ON 144, and HX 217.

Discovery
U-135 discovered and reported the convoy on 22 August while patrolling a formerly assigned station after having missed the signal to change position. The initial report caused some confusion because of the unexpected position and a coding error, but after U-135 sent two clarifying messages while shadowing the convoy, the wolf pack Lohs was ordered to converge on the convoy.

Stalking
While the Norwegian corvettes investigated HF/DF bearings provided by Viscount and Stockport on 23 August, Viscount conserved fuel by declining to engage in long daylight stern chases with U-boats. Viscount and Potentilla attacked HF/DF contacts more aggressively through the hours of darkness, but were satisfied by simply forcing the U-boats to submerge rather than conducting sustained depth charge attacks.

Attack
Visibility was reduced to 7,000 yards with patchy squalls under overcast skies on 24 August. As dusk approached, the escort had located only four of the nine U-boats in contact with the convoy. The convoy's course was altered to 267°  at 2300Z. U-605 torpedoed Katvaldis and Sheaf Mount on the starboard side of the convoy an hour after the course alteration. Viscount obtained a RADAR contact and forced the submarine to submerge. As Viscount was dropping depth charges, U-176 and U-438 entered the front of the convoy to torpedo Trolla and Empire Breeze.

Disengagement
The convoy escorts effectively intercepted attacks through the pre-dawn hours of 25 August. The calm sea conditions were favourable for the Type 271 centimeter-wavelength RADAR with which all the escorts were equipped, and prompt counter-attacks prevented the U-boats from reaching torpedo launch positions. A depth charge attack by Eglantine holed the conning tower of U-605. U-135, U-174 and U-438 were also damaged by depth charges. The shadowing U-boats lost contact after the convoy entered heavy fog after daybreak on 25 August, and discontinued pursuit on 26 August. U-256 was under repair for more than a year after being bombed in the Bay of Biscay on 31 August following depth charge damage from Viscount and Potentilla. U-438 aided U-256 reaching port, and U-174 refueled three Lohs U-boats before returning to France to repair damage. U-705 suffered several casualties when hit by gunfire from the convoy escorts; and was sunk in the Bay of Biscay by Armstrong Whitworth Whitleys of No. 77 Squadron RAF on 3 September.

The ships in the convoy dispersed off Cape Cod on 3 September to proceed independently to North American ports.

Ships in the convoy

Allied merchant ships
A total of 37 merchant vessels joined the convoy, either in Liverpool or later in the voyage.

Convoy escorts
The armed military ships of Escort Group B6, from the Mid-Ocean Escort Force, escorted the convoy during much of its journey.

See also
 Convoy Battles of World War II

Notes

References
 
 
 
 
 
 

ON122
C